Anthony Neil Smith is a mystery/crime fiction writer who has had over thirty of his short stories published in literary magazines and crime writing zines, and has also published numerous novels. He is co-creator of the well-received online noir journal Plots with Guns. He was also an associate editor with the highly regarded literary magazine Mississippi Review, having put together several special issues featuring crime fiction for the online edition. He is a Professor of English at Southwest Minnesota State University in Marshall, MN.

As Smith was born and raised on the Mississippi Gulf Coast, a portion of the proceeds from his second novel, The Drummer, was donated to Foundations For Recovery, a charitable organization servicing victims of Hurricane Katrina.

Works
Plots With Guns: A Noir Anthology
Psychosomatic, published by Point Blank, with new edition from Down & Out Books (translated into Swedish)
The Drummer, published by Two Dollar Radio, with new edition from Down & Out Books
Yellow Medicine, published by Bleak House Books, with new edition from Down & Out Books (translated into Italian and French)
Hogdoggin', published by Bleak House Books, with new edition from Down & Out Books (translated into French)
 All The Young Warriors, published by Blasted Heath, with new edition from Down & Out Books
 Once a Warrior, published by Blasted Heath, with new edition from Down & Out Books
 The Baddest Ass, published by Blasted Heath, with new edition from Down & Out Books
 Worm, published by Blasted Heath, with new edition from Down & Out Books
 Holy Death, published by Blasted Heath, with new edition from Down & Out Books
 Choke on Your Lies, self-published, later published by Down & Out Books
 Sin-Crazed Psycho Killer! Dive, Dive, Dive!, published by LA CASE Books 1 October 2013
Castle Danger: Woman on Ice, published by BE Ebooks (translated into German)
Castle Danger: The Mental States, published by BE Ebooks (translated into German)
The Cyclist, published by BE Ebooks (translated into German)
Slow Bear (novella), published by Fahrenheit Press

External links
 Foundations For Recovery
 Blasted Heath - Scotland's first digital publisher

Living people
Southwest Minnesota State University faculty
Year of birth missing (living people)
Place of birth missing (living people)
American short story writers